Giovanni Sergi Sergas (born 26 April 1959) is an Italian rower. He competed in the men's coxed four event at the 1984 Summer Olympics.

References

External links
 

1959 births
Living people
Italian male rowers
Olympic rowers of Italy
Rowers at the 1984 Summer Olympics
Sportspeople from Trieste